SAP Research is the global technology research unit of SAP SE with a network of 21 research locations worldwide. Each center is located in close proximity to an SAP development center or on a university campus. The group significantly contributes to SAP's product portfolio and extends its leading position in the market by identifying and shaping emerging IT trends and generating breakthrough technologies through applied research. In contrast to SAP's product groups and development labs that work on new functions and releases, the researchers explore opportunities that have not yet been developed into products.

The business model of SAP Research is based on co-innovation through collaborative research: in collaboration with leading universities, partners, customers, and SAP product groups, SAP Research drives the development of promising ideas and prototypes into market-ready software for maximum customer value. To that end, customers are involved early on in the research process through special Lighthouse Projects. Meanwhile, dedicated Living Labs demonstrate technological research in real-world settings, thus turning prospective SAP solutions into tangible experiences.
 
Among the most recent successes of SAP Research are the opening of the Future Factory in Dresden—a joint effort of SAP Research as well as industrial and academic partner organizations to foster research and development for the manufacturing industry—and its participation in the Cooperative Research Centre on Smart Services (Smart Services CRC) in Australia.

SAP Research locations
 Walldorf, Germany (Headquarters)
 Bangalore, India
 Mumbai, India
 Belfast, Northern Ireland
 Brisbane, Australia
 Darmstadt, Germany
 Dresden, Germany
 Karlsruhe, Germany
 Pretoria, South Africa (closed in May 2015)
 Raanana, Israel
 Sofia, Bulgaria
 Sophia Antipolis, France
 St. Gallen, Switzerland
 Zürich, Switzerland
 Shanghai, Nanjing, Chengdu, Xi'an, Beijing, China.

References

External links 
 SAP
 SAP Research and Innovation discussions, blogs, documents and videos on the SAP Community Network (SCN)
 SAP Research Report 2009/2010

Research